Kyle Wamsley (born March 1, 1980) is an American former professional road cyclist.

Major results

2004
 1st Stage 6 Vuelta a Cuba
2005
 1st Tour of Somerville
 2nd Rochester Twilight Criterium
 3rd Criterium, National Road Championships
2006
 1st Stage 7 Tour de Toona
 2nd Tour of Somerville
2007
 3rd Rochester Twilight Criterium
2008
 1st Overall Fitchburg Longsjo Classic
1st Stage 3
 2nd US Air Force Cycling Classic
 3rd Overall Tour de Toona
2009
 1st Stage 3 Redlands Bicycle Classic
2011
 5th Road race, National Road Championships

References

External links
 
 

1980 births
Living people
American male cyclists